Old Cotabato City Hall Museum is a city museum fronting Rizal Park Plaza in Cotabato City, Philippines. The structure was built in 1940s as the Municipal Hall of former Municipality of Cotabato also served as the visitors information center.

History
Built in 1936 under the leadership of the former Cotabato Mayor Jose Lim, later dubbed as Cotabato City Hall in 1960s when the Municipality of Cotabato is recognized as a City. 

Designed by the Filipino architect Juan Arellano before the war, this building is a legacy of neo vernacular architecture.

Exhibits

The museum houses the city’s historical artifacts, pioneer families heirlooms, and other noteworthy pieces of history such as vintage photos and books.

References

Art museums and galleries in the Philippines
Buildings and structures in Cotabato City